Fusspils 11 is the name of a German aggrotech, industrial, and EBM musical project collaboration of Ravenous and Funker Vogt members Gerrit Thomas, Jens Kaestel, Björn Böttcher, Tim Fockenbrock, Kai Schmidt, and Peggy Johanson.  Their two albums to date have been completely in German.

Albums
Gib Ihr Einen Namen (1998)
Elektro-Polizei: Alarm Für Fusspils 11! (2005)

See also
Funker Vogt
Fictional
Ravenous
Gecko Sector

External links 
Fusspils 11
Fusspils 11 English Fansite

Electronic body music groups
German electronic music groups
German industrial music groups
Zoth Ommog Records artists